Dmitriy Polyunin (born April 6, 1969) is a retired javelin thrower from Uzbekistan, who competed for the Unified Team at the 1992 Summer Olympics in Barcelona, Spain. There he did not reach the final, although he was ranked as the number ten of the world in 1992 (85.74 metres).

Doping
Polyunin tested positive for the anabolic steroid stanozolol at the 1993 World Championships in Athletics and had to hand back the bronze medal. He received a four-year ban from sports for the anti-doping rule violation.

Seasonal bests by year
1988 - 69.12
1991 - 78.50
1992 - 85.74
1993 - 81.04
1999 - 77.74
2000 - 77.74

Achievements

References

 Year Ranking

sports-reference

1969 births
Living people
Doping cases in athletics
Russian male javelin throwers
Uzbekistani sportspeople in doping cases
Uzbekistani male javelin throwers
Athletes (track and field) at the 1992 Summer Olympics
Olympic athletes of the Unified Team
Athletes stripped of World Athletics Championships medals